Joshua Rundell (6 May 1861 – 7 January 1922) was an Australian cricketer. He played in two first-class matches for South Australia between 1883 and 1885.

See also
 List of South Australian representative cricketers

References

External links
 

1861 births
1922 deaths
Australian cricketers
South Australia cricketers
Cricketers from Melbourne